A local service district is a type of designated place in the Canadian province of New Brunswick. In the Canadian province of Newfoundland and Labrador, a local service district is a defined area led by an elected committee responsible for the delivery of services including water, sewer, fire, garbage, street lighting, animal control, and/or road maintenance services to ratepayers within a defined area.

See also 
 Local service district (New Brunswick)
 Local service district (Newfoundland and Labrador)
 Local services board (Ontario)
 Subdivisions of Indonesia

References 

Types of administrative division
Geography of Canada